Allen (Lakota: Wagmíza Wakpála; "corn creek") is a census-designated place on the Pine Ridge Indian Reservation in Bennett County, South Dakota, United States, that was named for the Allen Township (civil township), which it encompasses. As of the 2020 census, the CDP had a population of 460. It is one of two places which are closest to the North American continental pole of inaccessibility.

History
The CDP is named for the Allen Township, which in turn was named for Charles W. Allen, the town's first merchant.

Geography

Allen has been assigned the ZIP code 57714 throughout the CDP.

Demographics

2020
As of the census of 2020. there were 460 people and 84 households in the CDP. The racial makeup of the CDP was 0.87% White, 98.91% Native American, and 0.22% from two or more races. Hispanic or Latino of any race were 1.52% of the population.

2010
As of the census of 2010, there were 420 people living in the CDP.

2000
As of the census of 2000, there were 419 people, 80 households, and 70 families living in the CDP. The racial makeup of the CDP was 4.30% White, 94.03% Native American, and 1.67% from two or more races. Hispanic or Latino of any race were 1.43% of the population.

There were 80 households, out of which 62.5% had children under the age of 18 living with them, 21.3% were married couples living together, 50.0% had a female householder with no husband present, and 12.5% were non-families. 10.0% of all households were made up of individuals, and 1.3% had someone living alone who was 65 years of age or older. The average household size was 5.24 and the average family size was 5.51.

In the CDP, the population was spread out, with 50.4% under the age of 18, 13.8% from 18 to 24, 21.5% from 25 to 44, 12.2% from 45 to 64, and 2.1% who were 65 years of age or older. The median age was 18 years. For every 100 females, there were 99.5 males. For every 100 females age 18 and over, there were 89.1 males.

The median income for a household in the CDP was $7,578, and the median income for a family was $3,819. Males had a median income of $0 versus $12,188 for females. The per capita income for the CDP was $1,539. About 95.9% of families and 96.1% of the population were below the poverty line, including 97.1% of those under age 18 and 100.0% of those age 65 or over.

Education
The Bureau of Indian Education (BIE) is affiliated with the American Horse School, a K-8 school operated by a tribal group.

It was established in 1931 as the consolidation of Day School #20 and Day School #21, with the former buildings of those two schools becoming teacher housing. , its enrollment is 330. In 2015, the Minneapolis Star-Tribune editorial board wrote that American Horse had poor insulation, had too many students relative to building capacity, has tile flooring in poor repair and using asbestos, and "lacks the electrical and communications infrastructure needed to support the technology used in modern education."

The town, like other areas in the county, is within Bennett County School District 03-1.

The Allen Youth Center, which opened in 2014, provides tutoring, recreation, and food distribution. It has been powered with solar panels since 2018.

See also
 List of census-designated places in South Dakota

References

External links

Census-designated places in Bennett County, South Dakota
Census-designated places in South Dakota
Pine Ridge Indian Reservation